The first season of the Australian drama television series Wonderland, began airing on 21 August 2013 on Network Ten. The finale aired on 13 November 2013. The season consisted of 13 episodes and aired on Wednesdays at 8:30pm.

Production 
On 2 July 2012, the Ten announced a new drama project from Fremantle Media named Wonderland, a 22-episode project set to air in two seasons - a drama series by Jo Porter and Sarah Walker.

Cast

Main 
 Anna Bamford as Miranda Beaumont
 Michael Dorman as Tom Wilcox
 Emma Lung as Collette Riger
 Tracy Mann as Maggie Wilcox
 Glenn McMillan as Carlos Dos Santos
 Ben Mingay as Rob Duffy
 Tim Ross as Steve Beaumont
 Brooke Satchwell as Grace Barnes
 Jessica Tovey as Dani Varvaris

Recurring 
 Christie Whelan Browne as Kristen
 Peter Phelps as Warwick Wilcox
 Michael Booth as Harry Hewitt

Guest 
 Matt Abercromby as Ben
 Roy Billing as Peter Varvaris
 Maggie Dence as Ruth MacPherson
 Tom O'Sullivan as Adam Evans
 Gia Carides as Helena

Episodes

Ratings 
The premiere episode debuted to 948,000 viewers and came 4th for the night in its 8:30 timeslot.

Figures are OzTAM Data for the five City Metro areas.
Overnight - Live broadcast and recordings viewed the same night.
Consolidated - Live broadcast and recordings viewed within the following seven days.

References 

2013 Australian television seasons